Clegg may refer to:

Clegg (name), given name and surname (including a list of people with the name)
Cleg or horse-fly, large, agile fly with bloodsucking females
Clegg, North Carolina, unincorporated community in the United States
Clegg (film), 1970 British crime film

See also